Frederick Skene (July 25, 1874 – August 22, 1943) was an American civil engineer and politician from New York. He was New York State Engineer and Surveyor from 1907 to 1908. He was Dean of the School of Technology at City College of New York from 1940 to 1943.

Life
He was born on July 25, 1874 in Garrison, New York, the son of Thomas Skene and Marry (Parry) Skene.  He lived in Long Island City, Queens.

He graduated from New York University.

He was New York State Engineer and Surveyor from 1907 to 1908, elected on the Democratic Party/Independence League fusion ticket in 1906.

During and after his tenure, suspicions of graft and fraudulent contracts for roadworks came up. In 1910, he was indicted on 17 counts of grand larceny in office. At his trial for one of the indictments he was defended by William Travers Jerome. Skene was acquitted by the jury, and his accuser Charles H. O'Neil, who had been his Confidential Assistant, was arrested on charges of perjury. The other 16 indictments were quashed in 1912.

He was Dean of the School of Technology of City College of New York until January 1940 when he retired.

He died on August 22, 1943 in Queens, New York at age 69. His funeral was held in Astoria, New York and the bell at City College of New York was rung in his honor at noon.

References

Further reading
His appointments, in NYT on December 30, 1906
The trial begins, in NYT on September 3, 1910
The trial continues, in NYT on September 6, 1910
Skene testifies, in NYT on September 8, 1910
Skene acquitted, in NYT on September 9, 1910
Further developments of the trial and indictments, in NYT on August 29, 1913

1874 births
1943 deaths
New York State Engineers and Surveyors
New York University alumni
American civil engineers
People from Queens, New York
People from Garrison, New York
New York (state) Democrats
United States Independence Party politicians